Swamp rat(s) may refer to:

Animals
Swamp rat is a common name for a number of not closely related types of semiaquatic rodents of superfamily Muroidea, including:
Andean swamp rat (Neotomys ebriosus), a cricetid
Australian swamp rat (Rattus lutreolus), a murid
Malacomys, three murid species of Africa:
Scapteromys, three cricetid species from southeastern South America:
Swamp rice rat (Oryzomys palustris), a cricetid of southeastern North America

It may also refer to the semiaquatic echimyid known as the coypu.

Other
a series of famous Top Fuel dragsters created by Don Garlits
Swamp Ratte', former name of hacker Grandmaster Ratte'
A subset of hillbilly or redneck that lives near the bayou.

Animal common name disambiguation pages